Marina Mabrey (born September 14, 1996) is an American professional basketball player for the Chicago Sky of the Women's National Basketball Association (WNBA). Mabrey was drafted in the second round (19th pick overall) by the Los Angeles Sparks in the 2019 WNBA draft. She previously played with the United States women's national under-19 basketball team and the University of Notre Dame.

She was traded to the Dallas Wings in 2020 and gained international experience with Latvian club TTT Riga, Israeli club Bnot Hertzeliya and Perth Lynx in Australia for the 2021–22 WNBL season.

Early life 
Mabrey was raised in Belmar, New Jersey to Patti and Roy Mabrey. She has two brothers Ryan and Roy and two sisters Michaela and Dara. It was Roy's and Michaela's love of basketball that first involved Marina in the game. Her mother coached basketball in their area and Marina, Roy and Michaela would go along with their mother and join in the practices. Fierce basketball competition became a part of family life in the Mabrey household with Marina frequently competing with her older brother and sister in their driveway and local park.

Mabrey attended Manasquan High School in Manasquan, New Jersey, where she was part of two teams that won the state Tournament of Champions and shared most valuable player honors in the McDonald's All-American Game in 2015.

Despite her sister Michaela's success as part of the Notre Dame Fighting Irish women's basketball team Marina doubted whether or not to choose that college when she was considering many offers for a basketball scholarship after high school. She chose to join up with coach Muffet McGraw's squad in 2015.

College career 
Mabrey joined sister Michaela in the 2015–16 Notre Dame Fighting Irish women's basketball team following a season in which the team were runners-up in the national championship but required to be rebuilt. She quickly established herself and won "rookie of the week" in November 2015 after recording a triple-double at Valparaiso. Her 35 appearances as a rookie, 85 three-pointers (which ranks as the second most for a single season in program history) and an impressive 10.7 points per game gained her honors in the ACC All-Freshman Team (Blue Ribbon Panel & Coaches) and ACC All-Academic Team.

The 2016–17 Notre Dame Fighting Irish women's basketball team reached the Elite Eight but fell for the second year running to Stanford Cardinal women's basketball. Mabrey was chosen along with Arike Ogunbowale and Lindsay Allen for the regional all-tournament team.

The Notre Dame team for the following two years saw records fall, two national championship games and one championship victory. Mabrey was a key component of a team that survived a rash of injuries that won the 2018 national championship and commented later that the injuries had given the now smaller team an added mental toughness that "there is no-one else to sub in" and that they had to battle through. The fighting mentality led to comebacks throughout the season with Mabrey moving to a more direct point guard role and taking more leadership with the largest fightback in Notre Dame history coming back against Tennessee from 23 points behind. The team executed the largest comeback in a championship game in NCAA women's basketball history, overcoming a 15-point deficit to achieve a 61–58 victory over fellow No. 1 seed Mississippi State.

She graduated in 2019 as Notre Dame's all-time leader in made three-pointers with 274; 1,896 career points ranks eighth all-time and a career 81.7 percent from the line – ranking sixth for Notre Dame.

Notre  Dame statistics 
Source

Professional career

United States

Mabrey was drafted 19th overall in the 2019 WNBA draft by the Los Angeles Sparks. The Sparks, under new head coach Derek Fisher, reached the play-off semi-finals with a regular season record of 22–12. Mabrey saw limited minutes during the playoffs. She appeared in 31 games with the Sparks during her rookie season and averaged 4.0 points, 1.2 rebounds and 1.0 assists while shooting 34.4% from the field.

Prior to the 2020 WNBA season, Mabrey was traded by the Sparks to the Dallas Wings for a 2021 second round draft choice. Due to the COVID-19 pandemic, the 2020 WNBA season was reduced to a 22-game regular season at IMG Academy, without fans present. In 19 games for the Wings, Mabrey averaged 10.0 points, 3.1 rebounds, 2.3 assists and 1.3 steals per game.

Mabrey returned to the Dallas Wings for the 2021 WNBA season.

Chicago Sky (2023-present) 

On February 11, 2023 Mabrey was traded to the Chicago Sky in a four-team trade involving the New York Liberty, Phoenix Mercury, Dallas Wings, and Chicago Sky.

Overseas
For the 2019–20 season, Mabrey moved to Latvia to play for TTT Riga. In her first game she scored 24 points and led her team with eight rebounds to win 89–81 over defending champions UMMC Ekaterinburg which contained WNBA players Brittney Griner, Courtney Vandersloot and Emma Meesseman. Riga won only two of the following nine matches that were played. Mabrey settled in well in a young team and at the suspension of play she was eighth in the league in points per game (15.8). She left Latvia in mid-March after European play was cancelled due to the COVID-19 pandemic.

For the 2020–21 season, Mabrey moved to Israel to play for Bnot Hertzeliya. In 22 games, she averaged 23.2 points, 8.0 rebounds, 6.9 assists and 2.4 steals per game.

Mabrey signed with the Perth Lynx in Australia for the 2021–22 WNBL season. In her debut for the Lynx on January 2, 2022, she scored a game-high 30 points with seven 3-pointers in an 88–86 loss to the Adelaide Lightning. On January 23, she scored 34 points in an 86–81 win over the Sydney Uni Flames. Following this game, she was unavailable for over a month due to a foot injury but returned to contribute to the Lynx ending the season as runners-up in the WBNL to Melbourne Boomers after losing the final series by two matches to one.

Professional Statistics

WNBA

Regular season

|-
| style="text-align:left;"| 2019
| style="text-align:left;"| Los Angeles
| 31 || 0 || 11.5 || .344 || .273 || .875 || 1.2 || 1.0 || 0.6 || 0.2 || 0.8 || 4.0
|-
| style="text-align:left;"| 2020
| style="text-align:left;"| Dallas
| 19 || 12 || 21.3 || .430 || .418 || .667 || 3.1 || 2.3 || 1.3 || 0.1 || 1.6 || 10.0
|-
| style="text-align:left;"| 2021
| style="text-align:left;"| Dallas
| 32 || 8 || 24.2 || .405 || .342 || .882 || 3.9 || 2.9 || 1.0 || 0.3 || 2.1 || 13.3
|-
| style="text-align:left;"| 2022
| style="text-align:left;"| Dallas
| 34 || 32 || 28.0 || .420 || .351 || .681 || 3.6 || 3.7 || 0.8 || 0.4 || 2.4 || 13.6
|-
| style="text-align:left;"| Career
| style="text-align:left;"| 4 years, 2 teams
| 116 || 52 || 21.4 || .407 || .348 || .763 || 3.0 || 2.5 || 0.9 || 0.3 || 1.8 || 10.4

Postseason

|-
| style="text-align:left;"| 2019
| style="text-align:left;"| Los Angeles
| 3 || 0 || 5.3 || .333 || .500 || .000 || 1.0 || 0.7 || 0.0 || 0.0 || 0.3 || 1.7
|-
| style="text-align:left;"| 2021
| style="text-align:left;"| Dallas
| 1 || 0 || 17.0 || .125 || .250 || .000 || 3.0 || 2.0 || 0.0 || 0.0 || 0.0 || 3.0
|-
| style="text-align:left;"| 2022
| style="text-align:left;"| Dallas
| 3 || 3 || 32.7 || .429 || .455 || 1.000 || 4.0 || 1.7 || 0.7 || 0.7 || 4.7 || 15.0
|-
| style="text-align:left;"| Career
| style="text-align:left;"| 3 years, 2 teams
| 7 || 3 || 18.7 || .375 || .412 || 1.000 || 2.6 || 1.3 || 0.3 || 0.3 || 2.1 || 7.6

EuroLeague

D1 (Israel)

WNBL (Australia)

Personal life
In 2019, Mabrey started her own shirts called This Is My Kitchen in reference to sexism in sports and her 2018 NCAA Women's Basketball Championship win which she sold online for a limited time.

References

External links
Notre Dame Fighting Irish bio

1996 births
Living people
American expatriate basketball people in Australia
American women's basketball players
Basketball players from New Jersey
Dallas Wings players
Los Angeles Sparks draft picks
Los Angeles Sparks players
Manasquan High School alumni
McDonald's High School All-Americans
Notre Dame Fighting Irish women's basketball players
People from Belmar, New Jersey
Perth Lynx players
Shooting guards